Gaikodzor (in Russian Гайкодзор or officially Гай-Кодзо́р, in Armenian Հայկաձոր pronounced Haikadzor) is an Armenian  village in the Krasnodar Krai region, Russia, part of the Anapksky District of Anapsky Urban Okrug.

The village was originally named Galkina Shel (in Russian Галкина Щель) in 1908. 

On 8 October 1925, the village was renamed Gaykodzor (Armenian pronunciation Haikadzor - meaning the Valley of the Armenians). 

The village has the Armenian Apostolic Surb Sargis Church (in Russian Церковь Святого Сергия, in Armenian Սուրբ Սարգիս եկեղեցի) and the Armenian Arin-Bert cultural union.

See also 
 Armenians in Russia
 List of Armenian ethnic enclaves

References

Rural localities in Krasnodar Krai
Anapsky District
Armenian diaspora communities
Armenian diaspora in Russia